In the 1894-95 season, the Woolwich Arsenal F.C. played 30 games, won 14, draw 6 and lost 10. The team finished 8th in the season

Results

Football League Second Division

Final League table

FA Cup

References

1894-95
English football clubs 1894–95 season